Hajji (also transliterated as Haji, Hadji, or Hacı (Turkish)) is a common Arabic title meaning "one who has completed the Hajj to Mecca". It is also often used as a given name or surname.

Hajji may refer to:

Given name
Haji (1946–2013), Canadian actress
Haji Abdulwahab, Muslim leader
Haji Ally (born 1968), Tanzanian boxer
Haji Bashir Ismail Yusuf, Somali politician
Haji Bektash Veli (1209–1271), Islamic mystic, humanist and philosopher
 Haji Gokool Meah, an industrialist and philanthropist
Haji Mohammad Suharto, the second President of Indonesia
Hajji Alejandro (born 1954), Filipino singer and actor
Hajji Firuz, the traditional herald of Nowruz
Hajji Zayn al-Attar, 14th century Persian physician
Hajji Zeynalabdin Taghiyev, Azeri industrial magnate and philanthropist
Elhadjy Madior N'Diaye (born 1983), a Senegalese footballer

Surname
Bilal Hajji, songwriter and producer
Stelios Haji-Ioannou (born 1967), Cypriot entrepreneur
Michalis Hajigiannis (born 1979), Cypriot singer-songwriter
Mohamed Yusuf Haji, Somali politician
Osman Haji, Somali politician
Seamus Haji (born 1968), music producer

See also
Hajj (disambiguation)
Hadji (disambiguation)
Hagi
Hadzhiev

Arabic-language surnames
Arabic masculine given names